The Tularosa Original Townsite District in Tularosa, New Mexico is a  historic district which was listed on the National Register of Historic Places in 1979.  The district included 182 contributing buildings.

Tularosa was founded in 1862.

Architecture: Pueblo, California Bungalow
Historic function: Domestic
Historic subfunction: Single Dwelling
Criteria: architecture/engineering

It is located near the intersection of U.S. Route 54 (New Mexico) and U.S. Route 70 in New Mexico?

References

External links

Historic districts on the National Register of Historic Places in New Mexico
National Register of Historic Places in Otero County, New Mexico
Traditional Native American dwellings
Buildings and structures completed in 1862
Native American history of New Mexico